Anatoly Alexandrovich Popov (born July 10, 1960) is an ethnic Russian who was the Prime Minister of the Chechen Republic, Russia, from February 10, 2003, following the resignation of Mikhail Babich, to March 16, 2004. He was also acting President of the Chechen Republic from August 2003 to October 2003 during the presidential elections.

References 
 NEWSru.com. Премьером Чечни стал выходец из "Росвооружения" Анатолий Попов 
 Izvestia.ru. Компромиссный вариант. Новым премьер-министром Чечни стал Анатолий Попов 

Russian politicians
1960 births
Living people